Alvin is a city in the U.S. state of Texas within the Houston-The Woodlands-Sugar Land metropolitan area and Brazoria County. As of the 2020 U.S. Census, the city population was 27,098. Alvin's claim to fame is Baseball Hall of Famer Nolan Ryan, who moved with his family to the city in 1947 as an infant and lived there until he moved to Round Rock in 2003. The Nolan Ryan Museum is in the Nolan Ryan Foundation and Exhibit Center on the campus of Alvin Community College.

History

The Alvin area was settled in the mid-19th century when bull ranches were established in the area. The Santa Fe Railroad eventually expanded into the area, and a settlement was established along the railroad. Alvin was originally named "Morgan" by the town's residents in honor of the settlement's original resident, Santa Fe employee Alvin Morgan; upon discovery that the name Morgan had been taken, the town named itself after Morgan's first name. The town was officially incorporated in 1893, making it the oldest incorporated settlement in Brazoria County. Alvin Morgan received a land grant from the state of Texas prior to 1891.

Alvin was a sundown town, where practically no African Americans were allowed to live.

The city's unusual borders were the subject of a lawsuit against Missouri City when it attempted an annexation into Brazoria County and across Alvin's city limits in 2002.

The total included  in 24 hours, at the time the highest amount of rainfall in 24 hours in American history.

Geography

Alvin is located in northeastern Brazoria County at  (29.393698, –95.271588). It is bordered to the northeast by Friendswood and League City in Galveston County, and part of its southeast border is along the village of Hillcrest. Texas State Highway 35 bypasses the center of the city to the east; it leads north  to downtown Houston and southwest  to Angleton, the Brazoria County seat.

Demographics

As of the 2020 United States census, there were 27,098 people, 9,710 households, and 6,895 families residing in the city.

As of the 2010 Census, the population was 24,236 people, with a population density of 1,475 people per square mile. As of the census of 2000, there were 21,413 people, 7,826 households, and 5,603 families residing in the city. The population density was 1,302.9 people per square mile (503.2/km2). There were 8,442 housing units at an average density of 513.7 per square mile (198.4/km2). The racial makeup of the city was 82.28% White, 2.11% African American, 0.49% Native American, 0.79% Asian, 0.06% Pacific Islander, 10.88% from other races, and 3.40% from two or more races. Hispanic or Latino of any race were 28.09% of the population.

There were 7,826 households, out of which 39.3% had children under the age of 18 living with them, 51.9% were married couples living together, 13.6% had a female householder with no husband present, and 28.4% were non-families. 23.4% of all households were made up of individuals, and 7.7% had someone living alone who was 65 years of age or older. The average household size was 2.71 and the average family size was 3.22.

In the city, the population was spread out, with 29.7% under the age of 18, 11.1% from 18 to 24, 30.6% from 25 to 44, 19.3% from 45 to 64, and 9.4% who were 65 years of age or older. The median age was 31 years. For every 100 females, there were 106.5 males. For every 100 females age 18 and over, there were 103.2 males.

The median income for a household in the city was $38,576, and the median income for a family was $43,987. Males had a median income of $36,216 versus $22,580 for females. The per capita income for the city was $17,016. About 10.8% of families and 13.3% of the population were below the poverty line, including 15.4% of those under age 18 and 10.1% of those age 65 or over.

Education

Primary and secondary schools

Public schools

Students in Alvin attend schools in the Alvin Independent School District.

Schools within AISD include:
High schools:
 Alvin High School
 Manvel High School
 Shadow Creek High School
 Iowa Colony High School
Junior high schools:
 Alvin Junior High
 Fairview Junior High
 G.W. Harby Junior High
 Rodeo Palms Junior High
 Manvel Junior High
 Dr.Ronald E. McNair Junior High
 Nolan Ryan Junior High
 Jackie Doucet Caffey Junior High

Elementary Schools:
 Golda Hood-Bobbie Case Elementary
 Melba L. Passmore Elementary
 Mark Twain Elementary
 Dr. James "Red" Duke Elementary
 Glenn York Elementary
 Alvin Elementary
 Walt Disney Elementary
 Bel Nafegar Elementary
 Bob and Betty Nelson Elementary
 Don Jeter Elementary
 E.C. Mason Elementary
 Laura Ingalls Wilder Elementary
 Mary Burks Marek Elementary
 Meridiana Elementary
 Pomona Elementary
 Savannah Lakes Elementary
 Shirley Dill Brothers Elementary

Colleges and universities

Alvin Community College provides basic undergraduate courses and adult education. Alvin is in the ACC taxation zone.

Public libraries

The Alvin Library is a part of the Brazoria County Library System. The library closed in 2010 to repair damages done by Hurricane Ike, and during that renovation, a fire broke out causing major smoke damage. The library reopened in June 2011.

Transportation

Greyhound Bus Lines operates the Alvin Station at Yellow Jacket Grocery-Citgo.

Postal services

The United States Postal Service operates the Alvin Post Office at 455 East House Street, 77511-9998.

Community information

Thelma Ley Anderson Family YMCA is located in Alvin.

The Alvin Rotary Club sponsors a yearly Frontier Day celebration, which includes a parade and 5k Fun Run.

Popular culture connections

Alvin was featured in the CMT series Trick my What?, featuring the Froberg family, who have been members of the Alvin community for more than 70 years.

Notable people

 Bill Crider, author
 Douglas Duncan, professional bullrider
 Nathan Eovaldi, Major League Baseball starting pitcher, born 1990
 Joe Ferguson, former NFL player for the Buffalo Bills, was born in Alvin in 1950
 Gary Keithley, former NFL player for the St. Louis Cardinals
 Austin Miller, Broadway and television actor, reared in Alvin, grandson of George Stanton, resident of New York City
 Gunner Olszewski, current wide receiver for the Pittsburgh Steelers
 Nolan Ryan, Hall of fame Major League Baseball pitcher, reared in Alvin, resident of Round Rock
 Larry Wade Carrell, actor
 Randy Weber, member of the United States Congress. In 2012 Weber bought a home in Alvin

Climate

The climate in this area is characterized by hot, humid summers and generally mild to cool winters.  According to the Köppen Climate Classification system, Alvin has a humid subtropical climate, abbreviated "Cfa" on climate maps.

References

External links
 
 
 
 Alvin-Manvel Area Chamber of Commerce
 Handbook of Texas Online

Cities in Texas
Cities in Brazoria County, Texas
Greater Houston
Populated places established in 1893
Sundown towns in Texas
1893 establishments in Texas